Conus lobitensis is a species of sea snail, a marine gastropod mollusk in the family Conidae, the cone snails, cone shells or cones.

These snails are predatory and venomous. They are capable of "stinging" humans.

The species was named after Lobito Bay, Angola.

Description

Distribution
This marine species occurs in the Atlantic Ocean off Angola.

References

 Kaicher, S. D., 1977. Card Catalogue of World-Wide Shells, 13
 Filmer R.M. (2001). A Catalogue of Nomenclature and Taxonomy in the Living Conidae 1758 - 1998. Backhuys Publishers, Leiden. 388pp.
 Tucker J.K. & Tenorio M.J. (2013) Illustrated catalog of the living cone shells. 517 pp. Wellington, Florida: MdM Publishing.
 Puillandre N., Duda T.F., Meyer C., Olivera B.M. & Bouchet P. (2015). One, four or 100 genera? A new classification of the cone snails. Journal of Molluscan Studies. 81: 1-23

External links
 To World Register of Marine Species
 Cone Shells - Knights of the Sea
 
 Smithsonian, National Museum of Natural History: Conus lobitensis

Endemic fauna of Angola
lobitensis
Gastropods described in 1977